{{DISPLAYTITLE:5/16 inch star}}
A  inch star (9.7mm) is a miniature gold or silver five-pointed star that is authorized by the United States Armed Forces as a ribbon device to denote subsequent awards for specific decorations of the Department of the Navy, Coast Guard, Public Health Service, and National Oceanic and Atmospheric Administration. A gold star indicates a second or subsequent decoration, while a silver star is worn in lieu of five gold stars.

A ( inch) silver star is not to be confused with representing a Silver Star Medal (Silver Star).

inch star usage 
 inch stars are worn on a medal suspension and service ribbon with one point of the star pointing up. Up to five stars can be worn on a ribbon. There are no higher degrees of stars authorized after five silver stars.  On miniature medals, a special star is worn on the medal's suspension ribbon in lieu of a star.  If the number of authorized stars exceeds five, a second service ribbon is worn after the first service ribbon. The second service ribbon counts as one additional personal award, after which more stars may be added to the second ribbon.  If future awards reduce the number of stars worn on the first ribbon due to gold stars being replaced by a silver star, the second service ribbon is removed and the appropriate number of star devices are placed on the first service ribbon.  When bronze or gold stars or bronze oak leaf cluster attachments are worn in addition to a silver star or silver oak leaf attachment, the bronze or gold stars (bronze oak leaf clusters) are arranged symmetrically on the ribbon in relation to the centered silver device.  For example:  The first star (cluster) to the wearer's right of the centered silver device; the second to the wearer's left, etc.

Examples 
The following are examples of the first through twenty-sixth awards of a Navy and Marine Corps Achievement Medal with the gold and silver  inch stars:

Authorized decorations 
 inch stars are authorized for wear on the following United States Navy, Coast Guard, Public Health Service, and National Oceanic and Atmospheric Administration decorations ( inch stars are not authorized for wear on non-decorations when a subsequent decoration is awarded to members of the seven uniformed services: the United States Army, Navy, Air Force, Marine Corps, Coast Guard, Public Health Service, and the National Oceanic and Atmospheric Administration.

The US Army and US Air Force use an oak leaf cluster to indicate a subsequent decoration (oak leaf clusters are also authorized for wear on some non-decorations); a bronze oak leaf cluster is equivalent to a gold star and a silver oak leaf cluster is equivalent to a silver star.

See also 
Awards and decorations of the United States military
United States military award devices
Oak leaf cluster
Service, battle, or campaign star

References

External links 

Devices and accouterments of United States military awards
Star symbols